Port Kirwan is a small incorporated fishing community located on the southern shore of the Avalon Peninsula, Newfoundland, Canada.

Demographics 

See also
 Avalon Peninsula
 List of cities and towns in Newfoundland and Labrador
 List of people of Newfoundland and Labrador

References

External links
The Irish Loop
Newfoundland Heritage Site
Port Kirwan - Encyclopedia of Newfoundland and Labrador, vol. 4, p. 396.

Populated coastal places in Canada
Towns in Newfoundland and Labrador